The Blackburn Football Club is an Australian rules football club located in Blackburn, Victoria. They play in Division 1 of the Eastern Football League. They are known as the Panthers or the Burners, and play their home games at Morton Park.

The Senior Club has a Senior Side, Reserve Side, Under 19 side and an Under 19 Development Side which is in conjunction with Whitehorse Pioneers.

History

It is believed that there was football played in the area as early as 1890, however it is known that the club held its first official AGM in 1903. Once the club was formalised the club played in the Reporter Districts Football Association and played on the same oval which is currently used today.

In 1907 the club joined the Reporter District FA, a football competition sponsored by a local Box Hill newspaper. In 1910 the club went thought the season undefeated and won their first premiership. In 1922 the club won its second premiership with the Seniors, the club jumper at the time was black with a red hoop. Further premierships in this competition were in 1930, 1933 & 1935.

Blackburn transferred to the Eastern Suburban FL in 1937 after standing down for a year after being rejected a transfer from the Ringwood DFA. The move was almost successful as they finished runners-up to Surrey Hills.  They lost again in 1940 but premierships were to follow in 1941, 1950 & 1952.

Blackburn remained in the Eastern Suburban FL until it closed down in 1962. Half of the clubs joined the Croydon-Ferntree Gully FL to form the Eastern District FL while the rest went to the new SE Suburban FL. 

The club entered Division 1 of the EFL in 2003, having won the Division 2 Premiership in 2002. It has remained in Division 1 in the years since, and made the finals in 2011.

Blackburn's jumper is black with red stripes. The club's senior jumper changed in 2008, with a white patch added to the back of the jumper with a black number, similar in style to AFL club Hawthorn.

VFL/AFL players

 Jordan Lisle - Hawthorn, Brisbane Lions
 Tom Schneider - Hawthorn
 Bryan Wood - Richmond, Essendon
 Rod Appleton - 
 Ian Scrimshaw - , 
 Daniel McKenzie - St Kilda Football Club
 Ben Griffiths - 
 Xavier O'Neill - West Coast Eagles

Theme Song
We're a happy team at Blackburn,

We're the Mighty Fighting 'Burns, ( 2,3,4 ).

We love our club and we play to win,

Riding the bumps with a grin, at Blackburn.

Come what may you'll find us striving,

Teamwork is the thing that counts ( 2,3,4)

All for one and one for all,

The way we play at Blackburn,

We are the Mighty Fighting 'Burns.

*(Sung to the tune of ''The Yankee Doodle Boy'', and similar to AFL club Hawthorn).

External links
Official club website

References

Eastern Football League (Australia) clubs
1890 establishments in Australia
Australian rules football clubs established in 1890
Sport in the City of Whitehorse
Australian rules football clubs in Melbourne